Duncombe Frederick Buckley (14 July 1831 – 6 September 1855) was an English first-class cricketer and British Army officer.

The son of the politician Edward Pery Buckley, he was born in October 1829 at the family home New Hall at Bodenham, Wiltshire. He was educated at Eton College. Buckley played first-class cricket for the Marylebone Cricket Club on two occasions, playing against Cambridge University on both occasions at Fenner's and Lord's in 1851 and 1852 respectively, though without success as he scored just 9 runs across his two matches. He played alongside his brother, Alfred, in both matches. Buckley served in the British Army during the Crimean War, purchasing the ranks of lieutenant and captain in Royal Scots Fusiliers in October 1853. He was severely wounded at the Battle of the Alma in September 1854, but later returned to his regiment. Buckley was killed in action the following September while posting sentries in the trenches at the Siege of Sevastopol.

References

External links

1831 births
1855 deaths
Sportspeople from Wiltshire
People educated at Eton College
English cricketers
Marylebone Cricket Club cricketers
Royal Scots Fusiliers officers
British Army personnel of the Crimean War
British military personnel killed in the Crimean War